The acetabular labrum (glenoidal labrum of the hip joint or cotyloid ligament in older texts) is a ring of cartilage that surrounds the acetabulum of the hip. The anterior portion is most vulnerable when the labrum tears.

It provides an articulating surface for the acetabulum, allowing the head of the femur to articulate with the pelvis.

Acetabular labrum tear

Mechanisms of Injury

It is estimated that 75% of acetabular labrum tears have an unknown cause. Tears of the labrum have been credited to a variety of causes such as excessive force, hip dislocation, capsular hip hypermobility, hip dysplasia, and hip degeneration. A tight iliopsoas tendon has also been attributed to labrum tears by causing compression or traction injuries that eventually lead to a labrum tear. Most labrum tears are thought to be from gradual tear due to repetitive microtrauma. Incidents of labrum tears increase with age, suggesting that they may also be caused by deterioration through the aging process. Labrum tears in athletes can occur from a single event or recurring trauma. Running can cause labrum tears due to the labrum being used more for weight bearing and taking excessive forces while at the end-range motion of the leg: hyperabduction, hyperextension, hyperflexion, excessive external rotation. Sporting activities are likely causes, specifically those that require frequent lateral rotation or pivoting on a loaded femur as in hockey or ballet. Constant hip rotation places increased stress on the capsular tissue and damage to the iliofemoral ligament. This in turn causes hip rotational instability putting increased pressure on the labrum.

Traumatic injuries are most commonly seen in athletes who participate in contact or high impact sports like football, soccer, or golf.  The prevalence rate for traumatic hip injuries that causes a tear of the labrum is very low. Less than 25% of all patients can relate a specific incident to their torn labrum; however, they are often a result of a dislocation or fracture. Falling on one's side causes a blunt trauma to the greater trochanter of the femur. Since there is very little soft tissue to diminish the force between the impact and the greater trochanter, the entire blow is transferred to the surface of the hip joint. And since bone density does not reach its peak until the age of 30, hip traumas could result in a fracture. Tears of the hip labrum can be classified in a variety of ways, including morphology, etiology, location, or severity.

Anatomical modifications of the femur and or hip socket cause a slow buildup of damage to the cartilage. Femur or acetabular dysplasia can lead to femoral acetabular impingement (FAI). Impingement occurs when the femoral head rubs abnormally or lacks a full range of motion in the acetabular socket. There are three different forms of FAI. The first form is caused by a cam-deformity where extra bone is present on the femoral head, which leads to the head being non-spherical. The second deformity is referred to as a pincer deformity and it is due to an excess growth of the acetabular socket. The third type of FAI is a combination of the first two deformities. When either abnormality is present, it changes the position that the femoral head occupies in the hip socket. The increased stresses that the femur and or acetabulum experience may lead to a fracture of the acetabular rim or a detachment of the overstressed labrum.

Diagnosis
A acetabular labrum tear is assessed by physical examination followed by medical imaging. An MR arthrogram is more reliable than magnetic resonance imaging. A full confirmation can be done by arthroscopy.

Epidemiology
In the United States acetabular labrum tears usually occur in the anterior or anterior-superior area, possibly due to a sudden change from labrum to acetabular cartilage. The most common labrum tears in Japan are in the posterior region, likely due to the customary practice of sitting on the floor. Posterior labrum tears in the Western world usually occur when a force drives the femoral head posteriorly which transfers shear and compressive forces to the posterior labrum.

Rehabilitation
With physical therapy, there is only a small amount of evidence on rehabilitation techniques for the acetabular labrum. It is even thought that physical therapy could be controversial due to there not being any evidence of a specific effective therapy routine.
There are, however, some studies that report physical therapy could benefit the patient by bringing them back to “sports-ready” capabilities. It is advised that physical therapists keep up on the new findings and stay in close contact with the orthopaedic surgeon so they have the best idea of how to approach their patient's case. Following surgery, crutches will be used for up to six weeks and there should be no expectation to return to activities such as running for at least a period of six months.

Some things to note when rehabilitation occurs is that it is important to know the size and placement of the tear. There are usually four phases in the rehabilitation process noted as: "Phase I: initial exercises (weeks 1–4), Phase II: intermediate exercises (weeks 5–7), Phase III: advanced exercises (weeks 8–12), and Phase IV: return to sports (weeks 12+)".
All physical therapy regimens should be individualized from person to person based on all adequate criteria

In phase I of the rehabilitation process the first objective is to minimize the pain and inflammation. It is important to begin conducting small motion exercises that have up to 50% weight bearing capacity by the patient. A symmetrical gait pattern is imperative as not to create an imbalance in the muscles of the hip. Aquatic therapy is highly encouraged and looked upon due to its ability to help the patient move more freely without the pressure of gravity. To progress to phase II of the rehabilitation process patients should be able to complete straight leg raises while lying on their side to strengthen the sartorius and tensor fasciate latae muscles to build support in the leg.

In phase II the physical therapist should be trying to promote more flexibility in the soft tissue. There should be more emphasis on the beginning aspects of strength training while adding some resistance over time. In order to progress to phase III, the patient should be able to demonstrate a normal gait pattern and minimal pain with exercises like the single leg bridging to help strengthen the hamstring muscles to help with leg equality.

In phase III the focus is to begin building functional strength. Movements should include single leg exercises to build the muscle and challenge the strength of the hip.

In order to progress to phase IV the flexibility of the patient should be adequate. Phase IV is the final stage in which the physical therapist would assess and prescribe any further exercise up until the patient is ready to return to the sport. Usually the therapist would start using complex movements like squatting, kicking, and running. The therapist would look for symmetrical movements on both sides of the body without pain. If the patient demonstrates the symmetrical movements without pain, the physical therapist would use their discretion for the patient's clearance. Some things to avoid from while rehabilitating are sitting with "knees lower than the hips, legs crossed where hip is rotated, and sitting on the edge of the seat and contracting the hip flexor muscles."

Prevention
Hip labrum tear can occur in a variety of ways such as frequent twisting movement,
direct trauma, or degeneration. Despite the many different possibilities, a large percentage
of hip labral tears are not directly related to any specific action, making it difficult to
prevent such an injury. But it may be possible to lower the risk by strengthening the gluteus,
stretching before exercise, and discontinued use of repetitive twisting activities.

One way to prevent a hip labrum tear is to decrease the pressure on the anterior region.
The labrum is about 2 to 3 mm thick but is wider and thinner in the anterior portion. Studies have found that in the United States and European countries, hip labral tears are commonly found in the anterior region. Muscular imbalance of the pelvis can develop lower crossed
syndrome. It is caused by tight hip flexors and erector spinae with inhibited weak gluteals and
abdominals. Imbalance of the muscles can lead to an anterior pelvic tilt, increased hip
flexion, and lumbar hyperlordosis of the lumbar spine. This increases the pressure in the anterior
labrum. Weak gluteals during hip extension has also shown increased joint pressure in the
anterior labrum. To prevent a hip labrum tear, you will have to strengthen muscles or
stretch tight muscles that might cause any muscular imbalance. A great exercise to strengthen
the gluteus is the side lying hip abduction. You will be lying on your side with your legs on top of each other. You will raise the top leg up while keeping the knee and hip straight. This exercise
targets the gluteus medius and is effective especially in those with an anterior pelvic tilt. To stretch a tight hip flexor, you can do the kneeling hip flexor stretch that targets
the iliopsoas. These exercises are a great way to strengthen and stabilize the pelvis
and hip joint to prevent a hip labrum tear.

Stretching before exercise will affect the cartilage through "creep". It will place a
constant load on the labrum, allowing fluid the leak out and deform to the applied load. This is
significant for the viscoelasticity of the labrum. The hip labrum acts as a shock absorber, joint
lubricator, stabilizer and pressure distributor. With this essential warm up, it is possible for it
to be better prepared to prevent a hip labrum tear. Body weight squats are a great example of
stretching and warming up the body to induce creep before exercise.

See also
Glenoid labrum

References

Ligaments of the lower limb